WESR is a country music–formatted broadcast radio station licensed to Onley-Onancock, Virginia, serving Eastern Shore of Virginia. WESR is owned and operated by Eastern Shore Radio, Inc.

Translator
In addition to the main station, WESR is relayed by an FM translator to widen its broadcast area, especially during nighttime hours when the AM frequency reduces power to only 51 watts.

References

External links
 Coastal Country AM1330 and FM105.7 Online

1958 establishments in Virginia
Country radio stations in the United States
Radio stations established in 1958
ESR